Back in Town is a live album by the American folk music group the Kingston Trio, released in 1964 (see 1964 in music). It reached number 22 on the Billboard Pop Albums chart and is the final principal album recorded by the Trio for Capitol Records. The Trio's seven-year contract with Capitol ended in February 1964 with one album due. Unable to negotiate another contract, the group released this live album and  moved to Decca Records.

Reissues
Back in Town was reissued along with Something Special on CD by Collectors Choice Records in 2000. A bonus track, "C'mon Betty Home", which was written by Noel Paul Stookey and Peter Yarrow from Peter, Paul and Mary is included.
In 2000, all of the tracks from Back in Town were included in The Stewart Years 10-CD box set issued by Bear Family Records.

Track listing

Side one
 "Georgia Stockade" (Reynolds, Shane, J Stewart) – 2:33
 "Ann" (Billy Edd Wheeler) – 2:39
 "Ah Woe, Ah Me" (Reynolds, Shane, J Stewart) – 2:27
 "Walkin' This Road to My Town" (Al Shackman) – 2:37
 "The World I Used to Know" (Rod McKuen) – 2:49
 "Salty Dog" (Traditional, Reynolds, Shane, J Stewart) – 2:22

Side two
 "Let's Get Together" (Chet Powers) – 2:46
 "Isle in the Water" (McKuen) – 2:58
 "Farewell Captain" (Mike Stewart) - 2:40
"Tom Dooley" (Alan Lomax, Frank Warner) – 3:17
 "Them Poems" (Mason Williams) – 2:03
 "So Hi" (Reynolds, Shane, J Stewart) – 2:09

Personnel
Bob Shane – vocals, guitar
Nick Reynolds – vocals, tenor guitar, conga
John Stewart – vocals, banjo, guitar
Dean Reilly – bass
Glen Campbell – guitar

Production notes
Voyle Gilmore – producer
Pete Abbott – engineer
Ken Veeder – cover photo

Chart positions

References

The Kingston Trio albums
Albums produced by Voyle Gilmore
1964 live albums
Capitol Records live albums